The Caravans were an American gospel music group that was started in 1947 by Robert Anderson.  It reached its peak popularity during the 1950s and 1960s, launching the careers of a number of artists, including: Delores Washington, Albertina Walker, Bessie Griffin, Cassietta George, Dorothy Norwood, Inez Andrews, Shirley Caesar, Josephine Howard, Rev. James Cleveland, and more. The group underwent numerous personnel changes between 1951 and 1961. 1962 to 1966 provided the Caravans with its most stable group member lineup, consisting of Washington, Walker, Caesar, George, James Herndon and Josephine Howard. The group also made frequent TV appearances during this time on shows such as TV Gospel Time and Jubilee Showcase.

Founding

The Caravans were founded in 1947 under the name Robert Anderson and his Gospel Caravan by Robert Anderson in Chicago, Illinois to serve as Anderson's backing vocalists. The group consisted of Ora Lee Hopkins, Elyse Yancey, Irma Gwynn, Edward Robinson, the pianist, and Louise Overall Weaver as their organist. Their recordings between 1949 and 1951 were made under the names of Robert Anderson and Choir, Anderson Singers with Robert Anderson, Anderson Singers, and Robert Anderson and his Gospel Caravan.

In 1952, Gwynn left the group, a slight change of the group's name to Robert Anderson and The Caravans was made, and Nellie Grace Daniels and Albertina Walker joined the group. The group featuring Walker and Daniels under their new name made their first and only recording on April 18, 1952. During this recording session, a sequence of events happened, resulting in Robert Anderson parting ways with his background singers. Walker, Hopkins, Yancey, and Daniels and Lelia M.Davidson of New Jersey came into the group recorded the remainder of their tracks, and adopted the group name of The Caravans simply by dropping Robert Anderson's name from the group name. Walker was the featured singer on the records that the first version of the newly emancipated Caravans made, which had the measured style typical of artists influenced by Roberta Martin.

That changed, however, as other singers joined the group, which retained the close harmonies and precise rhythms of the original group, but now allowed each member the opportunity to solo on alternating leads. At their height in the late 1950s the Caravans combined the energetic, agile alto of Shirley Caesar on songs such as "Swing Low, Sweet Chariot" with the powerful contralto of Inez Andrews on "Mary Don't You Weep", the dramatic soprano of Delores Washington, and the frenetic piano style from Eddie Williams, a friend of Washington.

Bessie Griffin joined the group in 1953, but left after a year. Cassietta George also joined in 1953 and stayed for two years, but returned in 1960 to stay for another year before rejoining in 1962 and staying for another four years. Norwood joined in 1955 and left in 1957, forming her own group, the Norwood Singers. Inez Andrews joined, at the suggestion of James Cleveland, the pianist and arranger for the group, in 1957 and left in 1962 to form her own group, the Andrewettes (aka: The Gospel Challengers of Jamaica, New York). Andrews returned in 1966, only to depart again and go solo in 1967. Shirley Caesar joined the Caravans in 1958 and left to pursue a solo career in 1966.

1966-2000

By 1966 the group's popularity began to dim when Shirley Caesar and Cassietta George left to pursue solo careers. In 1967, longtime members Josephine Howard, James Herndon, and Delores Washington all left the group to pursue solo careers and form their own groups, with exception to Albertina Walker, who released a solo album in 1966 without leaving the group. During this time, former members, some of which had not recorded with the group since the mid-1950s, returned for recording sessions including Inez Andrews in 1966, and Rev. James Cleveland, and Dorothy Norwood during a session in 1967.

Loleatta Holloway and Julia Mae Price were also added to the group during the same 1967 recording session featuring Rev. Cleveland and Norwood. By 1968, the transition was complete, and an all new set of Caravans consisting of Walker, Loleatta Holloway, Willie James McPhatter, Julia Mae Price, Doris Willingham, and Gwen Morgan began to record for HOB records until c. 1971. In the early 1970s, The Caravans recorded some songs composed by Donny Hathaway for the small, Chicago based Caritas record label. The songs were released on a 45 rpm album.

Despite this release, by 1972, the group was disbanded. In 1976, Caravans members Albertina Walker, Cassietta George, Josephine Howard, and Delores Washington reunited to record an album for the Birthright Records label with all new material titled "Share", featuring special guest Isaiah Jones, Jr. on piano. After 1976, the group members still did reunion concerts occasionally. Notable reunion concerts include a 1988 Stellar Awards performance with Albertina Walker, Inez Andrews, Shirley Caesar, Delores Washington and Rev. James Cleveland, a 1994 reunion on a Dorothy Norwood album with Albertina Walker, Dorothy Norwood, Delores Washington, and Cassietta George, and a 2004 reunion for the Malaco Records "Gospel Legends" DVD with Albertina Walker, Dorothy Norwood, Inez Andrews, Shirley Caesar, and Delores Washington.  As of 2008, the group was touring with Walker, Norwood, Washington, Caesar, and Andrews.

Later years

Albertina Walker recently recorded a reunion album with her group The Caravans entitled "Paved The Way", which was released by Malaco Records on September 5, 2006. This was the group's first new recording since 1976. The group consisted of Walker, Norwood, Andrews, Washington, and special guest Evelyn Turrentine-Agee. The album was dubbed by Billboard Magazine as one of the most memorable releases of 2006 (Deborah Evans Price, December 9, 2006) and entered the Billboard charts in the top ten and has remained in the top forty for sixteen weeks. "Paved the Way" was recently nominated for a Grammy, Dove, & Soul Train Music Award. Albertina Walker died from respiratory failure on 8 October 2010.

Members
Ora Lee Hopkins (1951-1954; died 2000)
Elyse Yancey (1951-1954)
Irma Gwynn (1951-1952; died 2006)
Albertina Walker (1952-1972 and 1976 and 2006; died 2010)
Nellie Daniels (1952-1954)
Edward Robinson (1952-1953)
Louise Overall Weaver (1952-1953)
Charlotte Nelson (1953)
Bessie Griffin (1953-1954; died 1989)
Iris Humble (1953-1955)
Johneron Davis (1953-1957 and 1960–1962;  died 1965)
James Cleveland (1953-1957 and 1967; died 1991)
Cassietta George (1953-1956 and 1960 and 1962–1966 and 1976; died 1995)
Gloria Griffin (1954-1955)
Dorothy Norwood (1956-1957 and 1967 and 2006)
Sarah McKissick (1956-1958)
Imogene Green (1956-1957)
Inez Andrews (1957-1962 and 1966–1967 and 2006; died 2012)
Eddie Williams (1957-1959 and 1961–1962)
Shirley Caesar (1958-1966)
Delores Washington (1958-1959 and 1961–1967 and 1976 and 2006; died 2020)
James Herndon (1960 and 1963–1967)
Josephine Howard (1963-1967 and 1976)
Julia Mae Price (1966-1972)
Bessie Lance (1967)
Willie McPhatter (1967-1972)
Loleatta Holloway (1967-1972; died 2011)
Gwen Morgan (1967-1972)
Doris Willingham (1968-1969)
Isaiah Jones, Jr. (1976; present)
Evelyn Turrentine-Agee (2006)
Lelia Davidson (1956-1957)
Catherine Morgan (1956-1958)

References

Further reading
Heilbut, Tony, The Gospel Sound: Good News and Bad Times Limelight Editions, 1997, .
Horace Clarence Boyer, How Sweet the Sound: The Golden Age of Gospel Elliott and Clark, 1995, .
 Cedric J. Hayes and Robert Laughton, "The Gospel Discography, 1943-70" Eyeball Productions, 2007, 
 Bil Carpenter, "Uncloudy Days: The Gospel Music Encyclopedia" Backbeat Books, 2005, 

American gospel musical groups
Savoy Records artists
United Records artists
Specialty Records artists
Vee-Jay Records artists
Buddah Records artists
Musical groups from Chicago
Musical groups established in 1947
1947 establishments in Illinois